The 38th Expeditionary Airlift Squadron is a provisional United States Air Force unit. Its last assignment was with the 86th Operations Group at Ramstein Air Base, Germany, where it was inactivated on 15 September 2010.

History

World War II
The 38th Troop Carrier Squadron was activated at Patterson Field, Ohio as one of the original squadrons of the 316th Transport Group in early 1942. It was reassigned to the 10th Troop Carrier Group in 1943 and served as a training unit until it was disbanded in 1944. The squadron was operational training unit, from October 1942 until April 1943 it participated in the ferrying of gliders From June through August 1943 it participated in experimental glider operations.  It later served as a replacement training for glider crews and participated in maneuvers.

Cold War
The squadron was reconstituted in 1966 and served as a tactical airlift unit from 1967 until the fall of 1975.

Present day
The unit was converted to provisional status as the 38th Expeditionary Airlift Squadron and assigned to United States Air Forces Europe (USAFE) to activate or inactivate as needed.  USAFE activated it at Ramstein Air Base, Germany from 2008 until 2010.

Lineage
 Constituted as the 38th Transport Squadron on 2 February 1942
 Activated on 14 February 1942
 Redesignated 38th Troop Carrier Squadron on 4 July 1942
 Disbanded on 14 April 1944
 Reconstituted and activated 8 August 1966 (not organized)
 Organized on 1 January 1967
 Redesignated 38th Tactical Airlift Squadron on 1 May 1967
 Inactivated on 31 August 1975
 Converted to provisional status and redesignated 38th Expeditionary Airlift Squadron on 3 September 2002
 Activated on 27 June 2008
 Inactivated on 15 September 2010

Assignments
 316th Transport Group (later 316th Troop Carrier Group), 14 February 1942
 10th Troop Carrier Group, 19 May 1943 – 14 April 1944
 316th Troop Carrier Wing (later 316th Tactical Airlift Wing), 1 January 1967 (attached to 315th Air Division 8 February 1968 – 19 July 1968)
 313th Tactical Airlift Wing, 1 July 1969 (attached to 513th Tactical Airlift Wing 5 November 1970 – 7 January 1971, 13 September 1971 – 16 November 1971)
 316th Tactical Airlift Wing, 15 November 1971 – 31 August 1975 (attached to 513th Tactical Airlift Wing 11 March 1972 – 6 May 1972, 374th Tactical Airlift Wing 31 August 1972 – 29 November 1972, 513th Tactical Airlift Wing 7 May 1973 – 15 July 1973, unknown 29 August 1973 – 3 October 1973, 322d Tactical Airlift Wing 16 December 1974 – 15 February 1975)
 United States Air Forces Europe, to activate or inactivate as needed 3 September 2002
 attached to 86th Operations Group, 27 June 2008 – 15 September 2010

Stations
 Patterson Field, Ohio, 14 February 1942
 Stout Field, Indiana, 30 May 1942
 Sedalia Army Air Field, Missouri, 3 December 1942
 Bowman Field, Kentucky, 5 April 1943
 Laurinburg-Maxton Army Air Base, North Carolina, 21 June 1943
 Camp Mackall, North Carolina, 10 September 1943
 Laurinburg-Maxton Army Air Base, North Carolina, 17 January – 14 April 1944
 Langley Air Force Base, Virginia, 1 July 1967
 Forbes Air Force Base, Kansas 1 July 1969
 Langley Air Force Base, Virginia 15 November 1971 – 31 August 1975
 Ramstein Air Base, Germany 27 June 2008 – 15 September 2010

Aircraft
 Douglas C-47 Skytrain, 1942–1944
 Lockheed C-130 Hercules, 1967–1975, 2008=2010

Service streamer

References

Notes

Bibliography

External links

038
Military units and formations established in 1966
Air expeditionary squadrons of the United States Air Force
American Theater of World War II